Capital Power Income L.P. was a limited partnership that is engaged in the generation, acquisition, and sale of electricity in Canada and the United States. The company was founded in 2002 and is headquartered in Edmonton, Alberta, Canada. Capital Power Income L.P. is the parent company of Capital Power Corporation, a publicly traded company that is also involved in the electricity generation and transmission business.

Description 
Capital Power Income L.P. owns and operates a number of power plants and other assets in Canada and the United States, including coal-fired, natural gas-fired, and wind energy facilities. The company sells electricity to a range of customers, including utilities, industrial users, and other power marketers. 

Founded as TransCanada Power L.P. the company was renamed EPCOR Power L.P. after TransCanada Corporation sold its interest in the partnership to EPCOR Utilities Incorporated on September 1, 2005. It was then renamed on November 5, 2009 to reflect the transfer of ownership from EPCOR Utilities to its newly created spin-off Capital Power Corporation.

On November 7, 2011 Atlantic Power Corporation completed it plan of arrangement to acquire the company.

See also
 EPCOR Utilities Incorporated
 Capital Power Corporation

References

External links
 Capital Power Income L.P. Website
 SEDAR Profile

Defunct electric power companies of Canada
Companies based in Edmonton
1997 establishments in Alberta
2011 mergers and acquisitions
2011 disestablishments in Alberta